Leamington Airport  is located  east of the town Leamington, Ontario, Canada.

References

External links
Page about this airport on COPA's Places to Fly airport directory

Registered aerodromes in Essex County, Ontario
Leamington, Ontario